Bentonville is an unincorporated community in Benton County, Missouri, United States.

History
A post office called Bentonville was established in 1890, and remained in operation until 1954. The community was named after Thomas Hart Benton, as is Benton County.

References

Unincorporated communities in Benton County, Missouri
Unincorporated communities in Missouri